Mikhail Youzhny was the defending champion but decided not to participate.

3rd seed Janko Tipsarević defeated Marcos Baghdatis 6–4, 7–5 to win his first ATP title in his fifth attempt.

Seeds
The top four seeds received a bye into the second round.

Qualifying

Draw

Finals

Top half

Bottom half

References
 Main Draw
 Qualifying Draw

Proton Malaysian Open - Singles
2011 Singles